Michael C. Frank is a developmental psychologist at Stanford University who proposed that infants' language development may be thought of as a process of Bayesian inference. He has also studied the role of language in numerical cognition by comparing the performance of native Pirahã language speakers to that of MIT undergraduate students in numeric tasks. For this work, he traveled to Amazonas, Brazil with Daniel Everett, a linguist best known for his claim that Pirahã disproves a crucial component of Noam Chomsky's theory of universal grammar, recursion. Frank won the Cognitive Science Society's prestigious Marr Award for this work in 2008.

References

Cognitive development researchers
American cognitive scientists
Hunter College High School alumni
Stanford University Department of Psychology faculty
Living people
Year of birth missing (living people)